Frank William Henry Bentley (born 4 March 1934) was Archdeacon of Worcester from 1984 to 1999.
 
Bentley was educated at Yeovil School and King's College London. He was ordained deacon in 1958 and priest in 1959 . After a curacy in Shepton Mallet he held incumbencies in Babcary, Wiveliscombe and St Johns, Worcester
 before his Archdeacon’s appointment.

References

1934 births
Living people
People educated at Yeovil School
Alumni of the Theological Department of King's College London
Archdeacons of Worcester